De Mil Colores (English In a thousand colors) is the eighth studio album by Mexican pop singer Daniela Romo. This album was released in 1992, and it was produced by Bebu Silvetti, and it was a slight departure from the Pop sound of her 1991 predecessor, borrowing tendencies from caribbean music, with tropical arrangements very similar to the ones presented on her 1991 hit "Todo Todo Todo" from her last album. This was the last project of Daniela with EMI Capitol. It is also the last album of Daniela that appears in three different formats: LP, cassette and CD. The album and its singles all enjoyed great success on the billboard charts, just like her previous albums, with three of the singles cracking the Top ten of Latin billboard.

Track listing
Tracks:
 De mil colores
 En el espacio del placer
 Para que te quedes conmigo
 Lejos
 Yo no se vivir sin ti
 Átame a tu vida
 Que vengan los bomberos
 El día que te fuiste
 Anestesia
 A veces
 Estoy pensando en cambiarte
 Amor a contrapunto

Singles 
"De mil colores" reached #30 on Hot Latin Songs.
"Para que te quedes conmigo" reached #1 on Hot Latin Songs.
"Que vengan los bomberos" reached #9 on Hot Latin Songs.
"Átame a tu vida" reached #7 on Hot Latin Songs.

Album charts
This album reached the position #10 in Billboard Latin Pop Albums.

References

1992 albums
Daniela Romo albums
Albums produced by Bebu Silvetti